89 Combat Flying School is a disbanded unit of the South African Air Force, active from 1986-1992. The unit was formed on 1 July 1986 from the Mirage Flight of 85 Combat Flying School at AFB Pietersburg and its main role was to train aircrew to fly the Dassault Mirage aircraft.

On 26 July 1986, the school began receiving the dual seat Atlas Cheetah D aircraft and started offering a Cheetah conversion course to pilots already qualified on the Atlas Impala aircraft. The school was the first unit of the South African Air Force to receive the Cheetah D.

89 Combat Flying School began merging with 2 Squadron SAAF on 6 November 1992, to become Training Flight, 2 Squadron. Flying operations were conducted by 2 Squadron from 6 November 1992 and 89 Combat Flying School was disbanded on 29 November 1992. All remaining personnel and equipment was transferred to AFB Louis Trichardt during January 1993.

References 

Air force units and formations of South Africa
Training units and formations of air forces
Military education and training in South Africa
Military units and formations established in 1986
Military units and formations disestablished in 1992